Henry Boteler may refer to:

Henry Boteler (fl. 1386–1397), MP for Horsham
Henry Boteler (fl. 1413–1427), MP for Horsham

See also
Henry Butler (disambiguation)